"You Don't Have to Say You Love Me" (originally a 1965 Italian song, '"Io che non vivo (senza te)", by Pino Donaggio and Vito Pallavicini) is a 1966 hit recorded by English singer Dusty Springfield that proved to be her most successful single, reaching number one on the UK Singles Chart and number four on the Billboard Hot 100. Elvis Presley recorded a cover version in 1970 which was a hit in both the US and the UK. Other covers have charted in the UK, Ireland, Italy and Finland.

Original Italian version 
"Io che non vivo (senza te)" ("I, who can't live (without you)") was introduced at the 15th edition of the Sanremo Festival by Pino Donaggio — who had co-written the song with Vito Pallavicini — and his team partner Jody Miller. The song reached the final at Sanremo and, as recorded by Donaggio, reached No. 1 in Italy in March 1965. "Io che non vivo (senza te)" was prominently featured on the soundtrack of the Luchino Visconti film Vaghe stelle dell'Orsa (aka Sandra), starring Claudia Cardinale, which was awarded the Golden Lion at the Venice Film Festival that September.

Dusty Springfield version 
Dusty Springfield, who participated at the 1965 Sanremo Festival, was in the audience when Donaggio and Miller performed "Io che non vivo (senza te)" and, although she did not know the meaning of the lyrics, the song moved Springfield to tears. She obtained an acetate recording of Donaggio's song, but allowed a year to go by before actively pursuing the idea of recording an English version.

On 9 March 1966, Springfield had an instrumental track of Donaggio's composition recorded at Philips Studio Marble Arch. The session personnel included guitarist Big Jim Sullivan and drummer Bobby Graham. Springfield still lacked an English lyric to record, but Springfield's friend Vicki Wickham, the producer of Ready Steady Go!, wrote the required English lyric with her own friend Simon Napier-Bell, manager of the Yardbirds. Neither Wickham nor Napier-Bell had any discernible experience as songwriters. According to Napier-Bell, he and Wickham were dining out when she mentioned to him that Springfield hoped to get an English lyric for Donaggio's song, and the two light-heartedly took up the challenge of writing the lyric themselves: "We went back to [Wickham]'s flat and started working on it. We wanted to go to a trendy disco so we had about an hour to write it. We wrote the chorus and then we wrote the verse in a taxi to wherever we were going."

Neither Wickham or Napier-Bell understood the original Italian lyrics. According to Wickham they attempted to write their own lyric for an anti-love song to be called "I Don't Love You", but when that original idea proved unproductive, it was initially adjusted to "You Don't Love Me", then to "You Don't Have to Love Me", and finalised as "You Don't Have to Say You Love Me", a phrasing that fitted the song's melody. Napier-Bell later gave the same title to his first book, an autobiographical account of the British music scene of the 1960s.

Springfield recorded her vocal the next day. Unhappy with the acoustics in the recording booth she eventually moved into a stairwell to record. She was only satisfied with her vocal after she had recorded 47 takes.

Released on 25 March 1966 in the UK, the single release of Springfield's recording became a huge hit and remains one of the songs most identified with her. When she died from breast cancer in March 1999, the song was featured on Now 42 as a tribute.

The song hit No.1 in the UK charts and No.4 in the US billboard hot 100. It proved so popular in the US that Springfield's 1965 album Ev'rything's Coming Up Dusty was released there with a slightly different track listing, and titled after the hit single (the B side of the US single, "Little by Little", was issued in the UK as a separate A side and reached No.17 there). The song also topped the charts peaking at No.1 in The Philippines and peaked at No.1 in NME top thirty charts, it stayed in the number 1 position for two weeks from the week commencing 14 May 1966 to the week ending 28 May 1966. And also hit No.1 on Melody Maker magazine in May 1966.

Reception
Cash Box described the song as a "hauntingly plaintive slow-shufflin’ ode about an understanding gal who has no intention of tying her boyfriend down to her."

In 2004, the song made the Rolling Stone list of The 500 Greatest Songs of All Time at No. 491.

Charts

Elvis Presley version

"You Don't Have to Say You Love Me" was recorded by Elvis Presley for his 1970 album release That's the Way It Is, from which it was issued as the second single 6 October 1970. The track had been recorded in the evening of 6 June 1970 in Studio B of RCA Studios (Nashville), being the third of seven songs recorded that night. The session producer, Felton Jarvis, felt that the second take was good enough to serve as the master track but Presley insisted on a third and final take.

Reaching No.11 on the Hot 100 in Billboard magazine, "You Don't Have to Say You Love Me" afforded Presley a No.1 hit on the Billboard Easy Listening chart, also reaching No.56 on the Billboard C&W chart. It became a gold record. A hit for Presley in both Australia (No.7) and Canada (No.6), "You Don't Have to Say You Love Me" was twice a hit for Presley in the British Isles, with its original release reaching No.9 in the UK and No.17 in Ireland, in which territories the track's 2007 re-release charted with respective peaks of No.16 and No.29. The single went on to become the best-selling record of 1971 in Japan, with Oricon reporting sales of 225,000 copies, making Presley the first foreign artist in history to do so, until Michael Jackson released Thriller in 1984.

Other versions

English-language cover versions
"You Don't Have to Say You Love Me" has been recorded by many artists, including:

Lynn Anderson
Jessica Andersson, on her album Wake Up (2009)
Michael Ball
John Barrowman
Dany Brillant
Patrizio Buanne, on his 2007 album Forever Begins Tonight as "Io che non vivo/You Don't Have to Say You Love Me"; the track features lyrics from both the Italian and English-language versions
Mary Byrne
Glen Campbell, in 1999 on his album My Hits and Love Songs
Vikki Carr
Cher, on the 1966 album Chér
Taylor Dayne, from the 1998 album Naked Without You
Kiki Dee, on her 1970 Motown album Great Expectations
Jackie DeShannon, from her 1966 album Are You Ready For This?
The Floaters, No. 28 R&B in December 1977
The Four Sonics, No. 32 R&B and No. 78 Billboard Hot 100 in March 1968
Connie Francis, recorded a mixed English/Italian version
Robert Goulet
Guys 'n' Dolls, No. 5 UK (20 March 1976), No. 1 Ireland (chart debut 18 March 1976), No. 12 the Netherlands (24 September 1977), and No. 8 Belgium (Flemish Region) (1 October 1977)
Tracy Huang (黃鶯鶯/黃露儀), Taiwanese singer, on her 1980 LP album Songs Of The 60s
Red Hurley, No. 5 Ireland, chart debut 18 May 1978
Jill Johnson
Tom Jones
Patricia Kaas
Larz-Kristerz
Vicky Leandros
Amanda Lear, on her 2014 tribute album My Happiness
Brenda Lee
The Lennon Sisters
Shelby Lynne
Maureen McGovern
Lani Misalucha
Bill Medley
Matt Monro
Clarence Carter
Olsen Brothers
Arthur Prysock
Helen Reddy, from her first MCA album "Play Me Out" released in 1981
Smokey Robinson & The Miracles, on their 1966 album Away We a Go-Go
The Shadows, recorded an instrumental version in 1983
Carla Thomas, on her 1966 album Carla (Stax)
Isao Tomita
Mel Tormé, as a bonus track on 1997 CD reissue of Right Now!
Jerry Vale
Il Volo
Wall Street Crash, a vocal octet led by Keith Strachan, had a No. 6 hit in Italy in the summer of 1983 after competing with the song at Festivalbar
Denise Welch, whose 1995 remake was a double A-side hit with "Cry Me a River" at No. 23 UK
Jack Savoretti released a version in 2022 which starts with the original Italian version before switching to English halfway through.

International cover versions

Most international versions of the song were subsequent to Dusty Springfield's 1966 success with "You Don't Have to Say You Love Me" and reference that version's lyrics rather than the Italian original.

The Italian original, "Io che non vivo (senza te)", has been remade by Milva, Morgan (album Italian Songbook Vol 2/ 2012), and Russell Watson (album La Voce/ 2010). Patrizio Buanne also recorded "Io Che Non Vivo (You Don't Have to Say You Love Me)" for his 2007 album Forever Begins Tonight, the track featuring lyrics from both the Italian and English-language versions.

In October 1965, Richard Anthony recorded a French version of "Io che non vivo (senza te)", "Jamais je ne vivrai sans toi", which served as the title cut of an album release. In Quebec, Anthony's version of "Jamais je ne vivrai sans toi" competed with a local cover version by Margot Lefebvre, with both tracks co-ranked at No.38 in the annual listing of the top hits of 1966.

A Catalan rendering of "Io che non vivo", entitled "Jo no puc viure sense tu", was a 1965 single release for Renata. Pino Donaggio himself recorded a Spanish version of the song, entitled "Yo que no vivo sin ti", which was remade in 1971 by Angélica María for her self-titled album, and in 1987 by Luis Miguel on his album Soy Como Quiero Ser. Miguel's version ranked No.26 on the Hot Latin Tracks in Billboard. Iva Zanicchi has also recorded "Yo que no vivo sin tí".

One of the earliest non-English renderings of "You Don't Have to Say You Love Me" was the Finnish "En koskaan", recorded by Kristina Hautala on 24 May 1966, which entered the Finnish Top Ten in November 1966 - in effect superseding Springfield's version which had reached No.6 in Finland earlier that month. "En koskaan" spent eleven weeks in the Top Ten, also peaking at No.6. Subsequently "En koskaan" was remade by Lea Laven on her 1978 album release Aamulla Rakkaani Näin, by Kurre (fi) on his 1979 album Jäit Sateen Taa, by Mika Pohjonen (fi) on his 1993 self-titled album release, by Harri Marstio (fi) on his 1993 album release Sateenkaaren pää, and by Topi Sorsakoski on his 1997 album release Kalliovuorten kuu.

"You Don't Have to Say You Love Me" has also been rendered in Croatian as "Moju ljubav nisi hteo", recorded by Nada Knežević (sr), and also as "Nemoj reći da me voliš", recorded by Sanjalice. It has been sung in Czech as "Hledej k mému srdci klíč", recorded by Eva Pilarová, and also as "Jarní Víra" recorded by Laďka Kozderková (cs), in Danish as "Du Kan Gi' Mig Hele Verden" recorded by Grethe Ingmann, and also as "Jeg har ikke brug for løfter", recorded by Ulla Pia (da). It has been sung in Dutch as "Geloof me", recorded by André Hazes, in German as "Alle meine Träume" recorded by Peter Beil (de), as well as Corry Brokken and Ingrid Peters, while other German renderings have been recorded by Angelika Milster (de) ("Unser Traum Darf Niemals Sterben") and by Trude Herr ("Ich Sage, Wat Ich Meine"). There was a Swedish version, "Vackra sagor är så korta", recorded by Marianne Kock (sv), as well as Jan Höiland (sv) and Anne-Lie Rydé.

This song was covered by the late Singaporean singer/songwriter/lyricist Su Yin (舒雲) in Mandarin Chinese with the Chinese lyrics written by himself and given the title 祝福你, appearing on his LP album 黃昏放牛＊一片青青的草地 , released by EMI Columbia Records in 1967. In 1969, Hong Kong songstress Frances Yip (葉麗儀) recorded the song in alternate Mandarin Chinese and English language versions, with the title 誰令你變心/You Don't Have To Say You Love Me, on her EP 不了情 released by the Malaysian label, Life Records.

Sales and certifications
Elvis Presley version

See also
List of number-one singles from the 1960s (UK)
List of number-one adult contemporary singles of 1970 (U.S.)

References

1960s ballads
1966 singles
1970 singles
1988 singles
Dusty Springfield songs
Elvis Presley songs
Glen Campbell songs
Luis Miguel songs
Vic Damone songs
Guys 'n' Dolls songs
UK Singles Chart number-one singles
Torch songs
Pop ballads
Sanremo Music Festival songs
1965 songs
Philips Records singles
Song recordings produced by Johnny Franz
Songs with lyrics by Vito Pallavicini
Songs written by Pino Donaggio